Lilian Wooster Greaves (21 December 1869 – 28 January 1956) was a Western Australian botanist and poet.

She was born in Ballarat, Victoria where her father was lecturer of botany at the Federation University Australia. She married John William Greaves in 1893 in Ballarat, and their children Mabel and Grace were born in Victoria.

Her family moved to Western Australia in 1904, and at different stages lived in Wongan Hills, Mundaring, Cottesloe, and Leederville during the first world war.  The last place of residence was in Como.

She was a member of the Women Writers Club and representative of the Institute of British Poetry in Western Australia.

Her poetry was regularly published in local newspapers and magazines.

During the First World War she wrote patriotic verses and songs.

Some post war poetry was published in commemoration of Anzac Day.

Her papers are in the Battye Library private archives.

Books of poetry

 - reprinted in 1914
 — also in an illustrated edition, combined with a booklet about wildflowers -   (separate edition as:

Poems in newspapers

1920 - Where love dwells.

1926 - England.

References

Australian poets
Writers from Western Australia
1869 births
1956 deaths